The Realm of the Rye may refer to:

 The Realm of the Rye (1929 film), Swedish silent film
 The Realm of the Rye (1950 film), Swedish film